George Matthews Arnold , (4 July 1826 – 28 May 1908) was an English solicitor and politician, serving as Mayor of Gravesend and as an Alderman of Kent County Council on its formation.

Biography
George Matthews Arnold was born in 1828, the son of Robert Coles Arnold, J.P., and brother of the poet and journalist Edwin Arnold. Arnold was educated privately for the law; admitted a Solicitor, and practiced in Gravesend. He became the Hon. Sec. of Society of District Auditors of England.

Having interested himself in the religious controversies agitating the Church of England in the late 1850s Arnold, together with his wife, was received into the Church by Cardinal Manning in i860; shortly after this event he became legal adviser to the Bishop of Southwark, Thomas Grant. His professional work having meanwhile gravitated towards London, he acquired 60 Carey Street, a Queen Anne mansion in Lincoln's Inn noted for the woodwork of its interior. He afterwards built Milton Hall on the banks of the Thames, close to Gravesend, where he assembled a fine collection of Roman and other antiquities.

He was Mayor of Gravesend (re-elected for the eighth time in 1906), and a Justice of the Peace and Deputy Lieutenant of Kent. He was Alderman of the Kent County Council on its formation in 1888, and was Chairman of the Kent Education Committee from its formation till 1905. He was Chairman of the Law Union and Crown Insurance Co. and author of Gravesend in Days of Old and other archaeological works.

References

Attribution
This article contains public domain text from 

1826 births
1908 deaths
English politicians
English solicitors
English writers
19th-century English lawyers